St. Clair County Community College (SC4) is a public community college in Port Huron, Michigan. It serves as the primary center of higher education for the Blue Water Area. SC4 offers Associate degree and certificate programs. It also offers online classes and transfer programs to four-year institutions. In addition, working with University Center partners, students can earn Bachelor's and Master's degrees without even leaving the SC4 campus.

Classes are held in classrooms on the SC4 campus and taught online. SC4 has learning centers in Harbor Beach, Algonac, Yale, Peck, and Croswell, as well as its main campus in Port Huron. Through these regional centers, SC4 serves a large portion of the Thumb region of Michigan.

History

St. Clair County Community College began as Port Huron Junior College, which was the Junior College Department of the Port Huron School District. The college was established by act of the Board of Education of the Port Huron School District under Michigan State Law in 1923 and began operation in the same year.  It officially became St. Clair County Community College in 1967.

Athletics
The Skippers are affiliated with the National Junior College Athletic Association and play in the Michigan Community College Athletic Association. The school currently has women's and men's cross country, softball, women's and men's bowling, women's volleyball, baseball, men's and women's golf, women's and men's basketball, wrestling, women's soccer, and co-ed dance and esports teams. The 2009-2010 men's basketball team succeeded in winning their way to the 'sweet sixteen' of the NJCAA basketball championship tournament. The women's basketball team competed in the National Tournament three straight years from 2012 to 2014.

Honor Society
Phi Theta Kappa, the honor society for two-year colleges, has repeatedly recognized SC4's own chapter, Lambda Mu as being one of the best in the nation. It won the Chapter of the Year award in 2000, and has won the distinguished chapter award for 14 years consecutively. It's also the oldest society of its kind within Michigan, being founded in 1963.

Notable alumni
 Rob Thomson, major league coach for the Philadelphia Phillies

References

External links
 Official website

Community colleges in Michigan
Port Huron, Michigan
Schools in St. Clair County, Michigan
Two-year colleges in the United States
Educational institutions established in 1923
1923 establishments in Michigan
Michigan Community College Athletic Association
NJCAA athletics